Salayea District is one of six districts located in Lofa County, Liberia.

Districts of Liberia
Lofa County